Noel Arthur Clarke (26 December 1930 – 7 August 2022) was an Australian rules footballer who played in the Victorian Football League (VFL) and in Tasmania.

Career begins in Tasmania
Clarke signed with North Launceston at the start of the 1949 season, won the club's best first-year player award, and was among the better players on Grand Final day when North won the NTFA premiership. He was a star player the next season too when North Launceston won the State Premiership as well as another NTFA title.

Moves to Melbourne
Noel Clarke joined Melbourne in 1951 and played most games at full forward. He played a major role in the 1955 Melbourne premiership side by kicking three goals in the Grand Final.

Return to Tasmania
In early 1956 Clarke was cleared by Melbourne to play with North Hobart in the TFL competition.

References

External links

1930 births
2022 deaths
Australian rules footballers from Tasmania
North Launceston Football Club players
Melbourne Football Club players
New Norfolk Football Club players
North Hobart Football Club players
Tasmanian Football Hall of Fame inductees
Melbourne Football Club Premiership players
One-time VFL/AFL Premiership players